Samuel Pytts ( – 15 January 1729) was an English politician, MP for Hereford and Worcestershire.

Pytts was the son of James Pytts of Wick, Worcestershire and his wife Catherine Cliffe of Malvern.

He matriculated at New College, Oxford in 1689, aged 15.

In December 1699, Pytts was elected MP for Hereford in a by-election following the death of Paul Foley . In January 1701, Pytts was defeated, Paul Foley's son Thomas Foley taking the seat. in November 1701 Pytts stood at Hereford again, but gave up after a disastrous first day.

He served as High Sheriff of Worcestershire 1704–5, and became a freeman of Worcester in 1714.

He was elected knight of the shire for Worcestershire in 1710, re-elected in 1713. He was appointed a Lord of Trade by the Earl of Oxford in September 1713, holding office until December 1714.

He lost his seat at Worcstershire to Thomas Vernon in 1715, and did not stand for parliament again.

He died on 15 January 1729.

Family
Pytts married three times:
 Frances Sandys, daughter of Samuel Sandys , married on 20 January 1690. They had two sons.
 Edmund Pytts 
 a son, predeceased father
 Catherine Rushout, daughter of Sir James Rushout . They had one daughter.
 Catherine Pytts, married William Lacon Childe 
 Catherine Nanfan, daughter of Bridges Nanfan , married on 24 November 1720. Catherine was the widow of Richard Coote, 1st Earl of Bellomont and Admiral William Caldwell.

References

1670s births
1729 deaths
Alumni of New College, Oxford
High Sheriffs of Worcestershire
English MPs 1698–1700
British MPs 1710–1713
British MPs 1713–1715
Members of the Parliament of Great Britain for Worcestershire